Dabiri Tabriz Futsal Club was an Iranian professional futsal club based in Tabriz.

History 
Dabiri, placed 14th in table in the 2011–12 season and relegated to the 1st Division. But by the increasing of the number of teams, futsal committee decided to stay at the Super league. They won Iranian Futsal Super League title for the first time in the 2013–14 season,– under the guidance of Vahid Shamsaei.

Season-by-season 
The table below chronicles the achievements of the club in various competitions.

Honours

Domestic
 Iranian Futsal Super League
 Winners (1): 2013–14
 Runners-up (1): 2016–17
 Iran Futsal's 1st Division
 Winners (1): 2001-02
 Local League
 Winners (1): 2000-01
 East Azerbaijan Local League
 Winners (1): 1999
 Tabriz First Division
 Winners (1): 1999

Continental
 AFC Futsal Club Championship
 Third Place (1): 2014

Individual
Top Goalscorer
 Iranian Futsal Super League
 2013–14 Iranian Futsal Super League
 Farhad Fakhimzadeh (26 goals)

References

External links 
Dabiri's Stats and History in PersianLeague

Futsal clubs in Iran
Sport in Tabriz
Futsal clubs established in 1998
Sports clubs disestablished in 2017
1998 establishments in Iran
2017 disestablishments in Iran